This is a list of fixed-wing aircraft capable of vertical take-off and landing arranged under manufacturer.  The list excludes helicopters, including compound helicopters and gyrocopters, because they are assumed to have this capability.

For more detail on subtypes of VTOL, see List of tiltrotor aircraft.

A 
 AeroVironment SkyTote (tailsitter)
 AgustaWestland AW609 (tiltrotor)
 Armstrong Whitworth AW.171 (ducted fan)
 Avro Canada VZ-9 Avrocar (ducted fan)

B 
 BAE Harrier II (vectored thrust)
 BAE Sea Harrier (vectored thrust)
 Bell 65 ATV (Tiltjet)
 Bell/Agusta BA609 (tiltrotor), presently known as AgustaWestland AW609
 Bell Boeing Quad TiltRotor (proposal)
 Bell Boeing V-22 Osprey (tiltrotor)
 Bell Eagle Eye (tiltrotor UAV)
 Bell V-280 Valor (tiltrotor)
 Bell X-14 (vectored thrust)
 Bell X-22 (ducted fan)
 Bell XV-3 (first tiltrotor)
 Bell XV-15 (tiltrotor)
 Bensen B-10 (ducted fan)
 Boeing/McDonnell Douglas AV-8 Harrier (vectored thrust)
 Boeing-Vertol VZ-2 (tiltwing)
 Boeing X-32B (vectored thrust)
 Boeing X-50 (stoppable-rotor gyrodyne UAV - failed to achieve forward flight)
 Boulton Paul P.137 VTOL research aircraft
 Boulton Paul P.142 VTOL research aircraft

C 
 Canadair CL-84 Dynavert (tiltwing)
 Chrysler VZ-6 (ducted fan)
 Colugo Systems-ARcopter (tilt-quadcopter)
 Convair XFY-1 Pogo (tailsitter)
 Curtiss-Wright VZ-7 (flying jeep)
 Curtiss-Wright X-19  (tiltrotor)

D 

 Dassault Balzac V (separate lift and thrust engines)
 Dassault Mirage IIIV (separate lift and thrust engines)
 Doak 16/VZ-4DA (ducted fans)
 Dornier Do 29 (tilt rotor)
 Dornier Do 31 (thrust vectoring and lift jets)
 DuPont Aerospace DP-1 (vectored thrust)

E 
 EWR VJ 101 (tiltjets and lift jets)

F 
 Fairey Gyrodyne (gyrodyne)
 Fairey Jet Gyrodyne (gyrodyne)
 Fairey Rotodyne (gyrodyne)
 FLUTR model 1 (quadcopter gimbal duct tilt rotor swing wing)
 Focke-Wulf Triebflügel (tailsitter, not built)
 Fokker/Republic D-24 Alliance (mockup only)

G 
 Garrett STAMP (vectored thrust)
 Grumman Future Attack Air Vehicle
 Grumman Model 623
 Grumman Nutcracker (tilt-fuselage)

H 
 Hawker P.1127 (vectored thrust)
 Hawker Siddeley Harrier (vectored thrust)
 Hawker Siddeley Kestrel (vectored thrust)
 Hawker-Siddeley HS.133
 Hawker-Siddeley HS.138
 Hawker-Siddeley HS.145
 Hawker Siddeley P.1154 (cancelled supersonic vectored thrust)
 Heinkel Lerche (coleopter; not built)
 Hiller VZ-1 Pawnee (ducted fan)
 Hiller X-18 (tiltwing)

I
 Ingenuity helicopter (coaxial rotorcraft)

L 
 Lockheed Martin F-35B Lightning II (Ducted Fan)
 Lockheed XFV-1 "Salmon" (tailsitter)
 Lockheed XV-4 Hummingbird (vectored thrust with entrained air)
 LTV XC-142 (tiltwing)
 Lunar Landing Research Vehicle (gimbaled vertically-mounted jet)

M 
 Martin Jetpack (portable ducted fans)
 McDonnell Douglas AV-8B Harrier II (Tilted output vector and RR vectors)
 Messerschmitt P 1227 (VJ 101B)
 Moller Skycar (vectoring ducted fans)

N
 NASA Puffin (tailsitter proposal)
 Northrop Grumman Tern
 Northrop MRF-54E

O 

 Opener BlackFly

P 
 Piasecki VZ-8 Airgeep (ducted fans)

R 
 Republic AP-100 (ducted fans)
 Rockwell XFV-12 (wing lift augmentation, failed to fly)
 Rolls-Royce Thrust Measuring Rig (vertically mounted jet)
 Rotary Rocket Roton (rotating annular aerospike rotor)
 Ryan X-13 Vertijet (tailsitter)
 Ryan XV-5 Vertifan (liftfans)

S 
 Short SC.1 (liftjet and vectored thrust)
 Sikorsky Cypher (ducted fan)
 Sikorsky X-Wing (stoppable rotor; did not fly in this configuration)
 SNECMA Coléoptère (tailsitter)
 SoloTrek XFV (ducted fans)
 Springtail Exoskeleton Flying Vehicle (ducted fans)

T 
 Trek Aerospace Dragonfly (ducted fans)

V 
 VFW SG 1262 Schwebegestell
 VFW VAK 191B (vectored thrust plus vertical lift)
 Volocopter VoloConnect

W 
 Williams X-Jet (flying platform)

Y 
 Yakovlev Yak-141 (liftjet and vectored thrust)
 Yakovlev Yak-36 (vectored thrust)
 Yakovlev Yak-38 (liftjet and vectored thrust)

Z 
 Zhuchenko Vertoplan (tiltwing)

See also 
 Coleopter
 Compound helicopter
 Gyroplane
 Tiltjet
 Tiltrotor
 Tail-sitter
 Tiltwing

References

External links 
 Flying platforms
 Gizmagazines' PAV aircraft
 Horizontal or Vertical Take-off or Landing (HOVTOL) Reference US Patent 5,890,441

 List of
VTOL

it:Aereo a decollo verticale
sl:Seznam VTOL letal